The conversion of non-Islamic places of worship into mosques occurred during the life of Muhammad and continued during subsequent Islamic conquests and under historical Muslim rule. Hindu temples, Jain Temples, Christian churches, synagogues, and Zoroastrian fire temples have been converted into mosques.

Several such mosques in the areas of former Muslim rule have since been reconverted or have become museums, including the Parthenon in Greece and numerous mosques in Spain, such as Mosque–Cathedral of Córdoba, etc. Conversion of non-Islamic buildings into mosques influenced distinctive regional styles of Islamic architecture.

Qur'anic holy sites

Mecca 

Before Muhammad, the Kaaba and Mecca (referred to as Bakkah in the Quran), were revered as a sacred sanctuary and was a site of pilgrimage. At the time of Muhammad (AD 570–632), his tribe the Quraysh was in charge of the Kaʿaba, which was at that time a shrine containing hundreds of idols representing Arabian tribal gods and other religious figures. Muhammad earned the enmity of his tribe by preaching the new religion of Islam. Early Muslims practiced, or attempted to practice, their rituals by the Ka'aba alongside polytheists, until they eventually left Mecca, driven out by escalating persecution. The aborted first pilgrimage, which was prevented by the Quraysh, who promised to allow it the following year in the Hudaybiyah treaty, did not also entail the prevention of continuing practices by polytheists. However, before the second pilgrimage season, allies of the Quraysh violated the treaty, allowing the Muslims to return as conquerors rather than guests. Henceforth, the Kaʿaba was to be dedicated to the worship of the one God alone, and the idols were destroyed. The Black Stone (al-Hajar-ul-Aswad) at the Kaʿaba was a special object of veneration at the site. According to some traditions the text of seven or ten especially honoured poems were suspended around the Kaʿaba.

Jerusalem 

Upon the capture of Jerusalem, it is commonly reported that Umar, the Commander of the Faithful, refused to pray in the Church of the Holy Sepulchre in spite of a treaty. The architecturally similar Dome of the Rock was built on the Temple Mount, which was an abandoned and disused area since 70 AD in the 7th century but which had previously been the site of the Jewish Temple in Jerusalem, the most sacred site in Judaism. Umar initially built there a small prayer house which laid the foundation for the later construction of the Al-Aqsa Mosque by the Umayyads.

Conversion of church buildings

Europe

Albania
The Catholic church of Saint Nicholas (Shën Nikollë) was turned into a mosque. After being destroyed in the Communist 1967 anti-religious campaign, the site was turned into an open air mausoleum.
The church of St Stephen in Shkodër was converted into a mosque in 1479 after the city was conquered by the Ottomans.

Bosnia and Herzegovina

The Fethija Mosque (since 1592) of Bihać was a Catholic church devoted to Saint Anthony of Padua (1266).

Cyprus

Following the Ottoman conquest of Cyprus, a number of Christian churches (especially the Catholic ones) were converted into mosques. A relatively significant surge in church-to-mosque conversion followed the 1974 Turkish Invasion of Cyprus. Many of the Orthodox churches in Northern Cyprus have been converted, and many are still in the process of becoming mosques. 

 The Catholic St. Nicholas Cathedral in Famagusta was converted by the Ottoman Turks into Lala Mustafa Pasha Mosque in 1571; remains in use as mosque today.
 St. Sophia Catholic Cathedral in Nicosia was converted by the Ottoman Turks into the Selimiye Mosque, Nicosia; remains in use as mosque today.
 St. Catherine Catholic church in Nicosia was converted by the Ottoman Turks into the Haydar Pasha Mosque; remains in use as a mosque today.

France
During the Ottoman wintering in Toulon (1543–44), the Toulon Cathedral was temporarily used as a mosque for the 30,000 members of the crew of the Ottoman fleet.

Greece

Numerous orthodox churches were converted to mosques during the Ottoman period in Greece. Among them:

 The Church of the Acheiropoietos (Eski Mosque), the Church of Hosios David (Suluca or Murad Mosque), the Church of Prophet Elijah (Saraylı Mosque), the Church of Saint Catherine (Yakup Pasha Mosque), the Church of Saint Panteleimon (Ishakiye Mosque), the Church of Holy Apostles (Soğuksu Mosque), the Church of Hagios Demetrios (Kasımiye Mosque), the Church of Hagia Sophia (Ayasofya Mosque), the Church of Panagia Chalkeon (Kazancilar Mosque), the church of Taxiarches (İki Şerefiye Mosque), the Rotonda of Galerius (Mosque of Suleyman Hortaji Effendi) in Thessaloniki.
 The Cathedral church of Veria (Hünkar Mosque) and the Church of Saint Paul in Veria (Medrese Mosque). 
 The Church of Saint John in Ioannina, destroyed by the Ottomans and the Aslan Pasha Mosque was built in its place.
 The Theotokos Kosmosoteira monastery in Feres was converted into a mosque in the mid-14th century.
 The original Pantocrator (Kursum Mosque) church building in Patras.
 The gothic-style Panagia tou Kastrou (Enderun Mosque), the Holy Trinity church in Knights Avenue (Khan Zade Mosque) in Rhodes.
 The Brontochion Monastery, the Hagia Sophia (Ayasofya Mosque), and Panagia Hodegetria (Fethiye Mosque) churches in Laconia.
 The Hagia Sophia (Bey Mosque) in Drama.
 Parthenon in Athens: Some time before the close of the fifteenth century, the Parthenon became a mosque. Before that the Parthenon had been a Greek Orthodox church.
 The Fethiye Mosque in Athens was built on top of a Byzantine basilica. It is currently an exhibition centre.
 The church of Saint Nicholas (Hünkar Mosque) was originally a Roman Catholic church before it was converted into a mosque.

Hungary
Following the Ottoman conquest of the Kingdom of Hungary, a number of Christian churches were converted into mosques. Those that survived the era of Ottoman rule, were later reconverted into churches after the Great Turkish War.
 Church of Our Lady of Buda, converted into Eski Djami immediately after the capture of Buda in 1541, reconverted in 1686.
 Church of Mary Magdalene, Buda, converted into Fethiye Djami c. 1602, reconverted in 1686.
 The Franciscan Church of St John the Baptist in Buda, converted into Pasha Djami, destroyed in 1686.

Spain
A Catholic Christian church dedicated to Saint Vincent of Lérins, was built by the Visigoths in Córdoba; during the reign of Abd al-Rahman I, it was converted into a mosque. In the time of the Reconquista, Christian rule was reestablished and the building became a church once again, the Cathedral of Our Lady of the Assumption.

Ukraine
After the Ottomans conquered Mangup, the capital of Principality of Theodoro, a prayer for the Sultan recited in one of the churches which converted into a mosque, and according to Turkish authors "the house of the infidel became the house of Islam."

Middle East and North Africa

Algeria
Cathedrals and churches were converted into mosques in the mid-20th century include:
St. Philip Cathedral in Algiers, Algeria (originally a mosque, converted to a church in 1845, reconverted to the Ketchaoua Mosque in 1962)
Cathédrale Notre-Dame des Sept-Douleurs in Constantine, Algeria

Iraq
The Islamic State of Iraq and Syria converted a number of Christian churches into mosques after they occupied Mosul in 2014. The churches were restored into its original functions after Mosul was liberated in 2017.
 Syrian Orthodox Church of St. Ephraim in Mosul, Iraq; converted to the Mosque of the Mujahideen
 Chaldean Church of St. Joseph in Mosul, Iraq

Israel and Palestinian territories

 Church of Saint James Intercisus in the Old City of Jerusalem, transformed into Al-Yaqoubi Mosque
 Templum Domini (Dome of the Ascension, Dome of the Rock)
 Cave of the Patriarchs
 Tombs of Nathan and Gad in Halhoul, transformed into Mosque of Prophet Yunus.

The Herodian shrine of the Cave of the Patriarchs in Hebron, the second most holy site in Judaism, was converted into a church during the Crusades before being turned into a mosque in 1266 and henceforth banned to Jews and Christians. Part of it was restored as a synagogue by Israel after 1967. Other sites in Hebron have undergone Islamification. The Tomb of Jesse and Ruth became the Church of the Forty Martyrs, which then became the Tomb of Isai and later Deir Al Arba'een.

Lebanon
 Al-Omari Grand Mosque in Beirut, Lebanon; built as the Church of St. John the Baptist by the Knights Hospitaller; converted to mosque in 1291.

Libya
Cathedrals and churches were converted into mosques in the mid-20th century include:
Tripoli Cathedral in Tripoli, Libya (converted to Maidan al Jazair Square Mosque)

Morocco
 Grand Mosque of Tangier; built on a formerly Roman pagan and then Roman Christian site.

Syria

The Umayyad Mosque in Damascus; built on the site of a Christian basilica dedicated to John the Baptist (Yahya), which was earlier, a Roman Pagan temple of Jupiter.
 Great Mosque of al-Nuri in Homs; initially a pagan temple for the sun god ("El-Gabal"), then converted into a church dedicated to Saint John the Baptist
 Great Mosque of Hama; a temple to worship the Roman god Jupiter, later it became a church during the Byzantine era
 Great Mosque of Aleppo; the agora of the Hellenistic period, which later became the garden for the Cathedral of Saint Helena
The mosque of Job in Al-Shaykh Saad, Syria, was previously a church of Job.

Turkey

Istanbul

Hagia Sophia
Following the Ottoman conquest of Anatolia, virtually all of the churches of Istanbul were converted into mosques except the Church of Saint Mary of the Mongols.

After 1453 it became a mosque, and since 1931 it has been a museum in Istanbul, Turkey. From the date of its dedication in 360 until 1453, it served as the Orthodox cathedral of the imperial capital, except between 1204 and 1261, when it became the Roman Catholic cathedral under the Latin Patriarch of Constantinople of the Western Crusader-established Latin Empire. In 1453, Constantinople was conquered by the Ottoman Turks under Sultan Mehmed II, who subsequently ordered the building converted into a mosque. The bells, altar, iconostasis, ambo and sacrificial vessels were removed and many of the mosaics were plastered over. Islamic features – such as the mihrab, minbar, and four minarets – were added while in the possession of the Ottomans. The building was a mosque from 29 May 1453 until 1931, when it was secularised. It was opened as a museum on 1 February 1935. On July 10, 2020, the decision of the Council of Ministers to transform it into a museum was canceled by Council of State and the Turkish President Erdoğan signed a decree annulling the Hagia Sophia's museum status, reverting it to a mosque.

Other churches

Rest of Turkey

Elsewhere in Turkey numerous churches were converted into mosques, including:

Orthodox

Armenian Apostolic
Hundreds of Armenian Churches were converted into Mosques in Turkey and Azerbaijan. Thousands were destroyed after Armenian Genocide in 1915
Cathedral of Kars
Cathedral of Ani
Liberation Mosque, ex St Mary's Church Cathedral, Gaziantep

Conversion of Hindu temples

Conversion of Zoroastrian fire temples

Iran
After the Muslim conquest of Persia, Zoroastrian fire temples, with their four axial arch openings, were usually turned into mosques simply by setting a mihrab (prayer niche) on the place of the arch nearest to qibla (the direction of Mecca). This practice is described by numerous Muslim sources; however, the archaeological evidence confirming it is still scarce. Zoroastrian temples converted into mosques in such a manner could be found in Bukhara, as well as in and near Istakhr and other Iranian cities, such as: Tarikhaneh Temple, Jameh Mosque of Qazvin, Heidarieh Mosque of Qazvin, Jameh Mosque of Isfahan, Jameh Mosque of Kashan, Jameh Mosque of Ardestan, Jameh Mosque of Yazd, Jameh Mosque of Borujerd, Great Mosque of Herat as well as Bibi Shahr Banu Shrine near Tehran.

Influence on Islamic architecture

The conversion of non-Islamic religious buildings into mosques during the first centuries of Islam played a major role in the development of Islamic architectural styles. Distinct regional styles of mosque design, which have come to be known by such names as Arab, Persian, Andalusian, and others, commonly reflected the external and internal stylistic elements of churches and other temples characteristic for that region.

See also

References

History of Hinduism
History of Sikhism
History of Zoroastrianism
Islamic rule in the Indian subcontinent
 
 
Hinduism-related lists
Religious buildings and structures converted to a different religion